Noel Davern (24 December 1945 – 27 October 2013) was an Irish Fianna Fáil politician who served as Minister of State from 1997 to 2002 and Minister for Education from 1991 to 1992. He served as a Teachta Dála (TD) for the Tipperary South constituency from 1969 to 1981 and 1987 to 2007. He served as a Member of the European Parliament (MEP) for the Munster constituency from 1979 to 1984.

Career
Davern was born in Cashel, County Tipperary, in 1945. He was educated at CBS Cashel and at Franciscan College in County Meath. His family had a long political tradition. His father Michael Davern was a Fianna Fáil TD from 1948 to 1965, when he was succeeded in Dáil Éireann by Noel's brother Don Davern. After Don's sudden death in 1968, the seat remained vacant until Noel was elected to Dáil Éireann at the 1969 general election.

At the 1979 European Parliament election he was elected as an MEP for the Munster constituency. He did not contest the 1981 general election so as to concentrate his time as an MEP. However, he  lost his seat at the European Parliament at the 1984 European Parliament election.

Davern was again elected to Dáil Éireann at the 1987 general election, and came to national prominence in 1991 when he was appointed to the Cabinet as Minister for Education. This was in the wake of Albert Reynolds and Pádraig Flynn's failed attempt to oust Charles Haughey as Taoiseach. Davern's stay in government was short-lived because Reynolds became Taoiseach in early 1992 and he was again sent to the backbenches. In 1995, he became Opposition Spokesman on European Affairs when Bertie Ahern named his new front bench. Fianna Fáil were returned to government and Davern became Minister of State at the Department of Agriculture and Food. He served in that position until 2002.

Davern was one of only three Members of the 29th Dáil who had first been elected in the 1960s, the others being Séamus Pattison, elected at the 1961 general election and Michael Smith, also elected at the 1969 general election.

He died on 27 October 2013.

See also
Families in the Oireachtas

References

External links

1945 births
2013 deaths
Local councillors in South Tipperary
Fianna Fáil TDs
Members of the 19th Dáil
Members of the 20th Dáil
Members of the 21st Dáil
Members of the 25th Dáil
Members of the 26th Dáil
Members of the 27th Dáil
Members of the 28th Dáil
Members of the 29th Dáil
Politicians from County Tipperary
Fianna Fáil MEPs
MEPs for the Republic of Ireland 1979–1984
Ministers for Education (Ireland)
Ministers of State of the 28th Dáil